This article is about 1996–2003 seasons of Anyang LG Cheetahs.

Seasons statistics

All competitions records
※ K-League Championship results are not counted.
※ 1998, 1999, 2000 seasons had PSO and blows results are that PSO results are counted by drawn.
※ A: Adidas Cup, P: Prospecs Cup, PM: Philip Morris Korea Cup, D: Daehan Fire Insurance Cup

[1] In 2000, Tournament name was 1999–2000 Asian Cup Winners' Cup
[2] In 2002, Tournament name was 2001-02 Asian Club Championship

K League Championship records

Seasons Summary

1996 season summary

1997 season summary

1998 season summary

1999 season summary

2000 season summary

2001 season summary

2002 season summary

2003 season summary

Kits

First Kit

Second Kit 

※ Notes
(2) 2002 1st kit and 2003 1st kit are same but colour of adidas logo and 3 stripes on shoulder are different

Transfers

1996 season

In

Rookie Draft

Out

Loan & Military service

1997 season

In

Rookie Draft

Out

Loan & Military service

1998 season

In

Rookie Draft

Out

Loan & Military service

1999 season

In

Rookie Draft

Out

Loan & Military service

2000 season

In

Rookie Draft

Out

Loan & Military service

2001 season

In

Rookie Draft

Out

Loan & Military service

2002 season

In

Rookie Free Agent

Out

Loan & Military service

2003 season

In

Rookie Free Agent

Out

Loan & Military service

See also
 FC Seoul

References

 FC Seoul Matchday Magazines  
 The K League history at K League official website

External links
 FC Seoul Official Website 

1996-2003